is a Japanese television drama that aired on Fuji Television Monday nights at 9 pm from January 14 to March 25, 2013. It is based on a light novel series by En Mikami, which also inspired a manga in Altima Ace, later moved to Monthly Asuka. The story revolves around a young woman who owns a used bookshop, who becomes involved in various mysteries concerning the books she sells.

Synopsis
"This story takes place at an antiquarian bookshop on a secluded corner of Kamakura, Japan's ancient capital, called Biblia Antiquarian Bookshop. The owner of the shop is Shinokawa Shioriko, a young and beautiful woman who is overly shy and finds it difficult to converse upon meeting someone for the first time. On the other hand, the abundance of her knowledge in antiquarian books is second to none. When she speaks about these classic books, passion overcomes shyness and she becomes the most eloquent storyteller. Shioriko is your guide to unravelling the secrets and mysteries of antiquarian books through her vast knowledge on the subject and sharp observant eyes." --Fuji TV

Cast 
 Ayame Goriki as Shinokawa Shioriko
 Akira as Goura Daisuke
 Ryu Hashizume as young Goura Daisuke (episode 1)
 Kei Tanaka as Kasai Kikuya
 Kosuke Suzuki as Fujinami Akio
 Hiromi Kitagawa as Yokota Natsumi
 Jesse Lewis as Shinokawa Fumiya
 Elina Mizuno as Kosuga Nao
 Reina Triendl as Sasaki Aya
 Risa Naito as Hashimoto Sayaka
 Narumi Yasuda as Shinokawa Chieko
 Keiko Matsuzaka as Goura Eri
 Katsumi Takahashi as Shida Hajime

Reception
As of February 2017, the light novels had 6.4 million copies in print. In the same month, Kadokawa Corporation announced that the novel had got a live-action and the anime adaptation.

References

External links 
  
 biblia.jp 
 Kadokawa Special Network Page 
 Kodansha Comics Dedicated Website 

Japanese drama television series
2013 Japanese television series debuts
2013 Japanese television series endings
Fuji TV dramas
Television shows based on Japanese novels
Television shows based on light novels